Balsam Gap (el. ) is a mountain pass between the Plott Balsam Range to the northwest and the Great Balsam Mountains to the southeast on the county line dividing Haywood and Jackson counties in the U.S. state of North Carolina.

The gap allows both the Great Smoky Mountains Expressway and the former Murphy Branch of the Southern Railway, now owned by Blue Ridge Southern Railroad, to cross between the two counties running east–west. The Blue Ridge Parkway also runs through the gap in a north–south direction crossing both the expressway and railway branch.

The gap is named for the Great Balsam Mountains in which it lies. The small, unincorporated communities of Balsam in Jackson County and Saunook in Haywood County are also located close by.

References

Landforms of Haywood County, North Carolina
Landforms of Jackson County, North Carolina
Mountain passes of North Carolina
Transportation in Haywood County, North Carolina
Transportation in Jackson County, North Carolina
Blue Ridge Parkway
U.S. Route 23
U.S. Route 74